Giovanni Córdoba Rentería (16 March 1978 – 27 October 2002) was a Colombian footballer who played professionally for Deportivo Cali, as well as for Ecuadorian club L.D.U. Quito. On 24 October 2002, Córdoba and teammate Hernán Gaviria were struck by lightning during a training session. Gaviria died instantly, while Córdoba died three days later, on 27 October.

References

1978 births
2002 deaths
Colombian footballers
Colombian expatriate footballers
Association football midfielders
Deportivo Cali footballers
L.D.U. Quito footballers
Colombian expatriate sportspeople in Ecuador
Expatriate footballers in Ecuador
Association football players who died while playing
Sport deaths in Colombia
Deaths from lightning strikes
Natural disaster deaths in Colombia
Footballers from Cali